Tomsen is a surname. Notable people with the surname include:

 Peter Tomsen (born 1940), American diplomat and educator
 Walter Tomsen (1912–2000), American sports shooter

See also
 Thomsen
 Tomson